Burlin White (February 5, 1895 – April 5, 1971) was an American baseball catcher and manager in the Negro leagues. He played from 1915 to 1933 with several teams. He later managed the Philadelphia Giants/Boston Royal Giants.

References

External links

1895 births
1972 deaths
Bacharach Giants players
Chicago American Giants players
Harrisburg Giants players
Hilldale Club players
Lincoln Giants players
Pollock's Cuban Stars players
West Baden Sprudels players
Baseball players from Richmond, Virginia
20th-century African-American sportspeople
Baseball catchers